The Brain Eaters is a 1958 independently made American black-and-white science fiction-horror film, produced by Ed Nelson (and Roger Corman, uncredited), and directed by Bruno VeSota. The film stars Nelson, Alan Jay Factor, and Joanna Lee and includes a brief appearance by Leonard Nimoy (name misspelled in film credits as "Leonard Nemoy"). The Brain Eaters was distributed by American International Pictures as a double feature with either Earth vs. the Spider or Terror from the Year 5000 in different markets.

Plot
In Riverdale, Illinois, a man carrying a lighted, basketball-sized glass container bumps into a pedestrian. The container is broken, a fight ensues, and a hissing sound is heard.

Glenn Cameron and his fiancée, Elaine are returning home from announcing their engagement when they are distracted by a bright light. They stop to investigate in nearby woods and find three dead animals before coming upon a large, cone-shaped, spiral metal structure resembling a rocket nose cone.

Two days later, in Washington, D.C., a flying saucer investigation committee reviews classified army footage of the object. Sen. Walter K. Powers and his assistant Dan Walker arrive late. The metal object stands 50 feet high and has a base diameter of 50 feet. The nature and origin of the object is unknown. Dr. Paul Kettering is the chief investigator. Also noted is the murder of several people in the nearby town. The senator and his assistant fly to Riverdale to investigate and are met by Glenn Cameron, who explains that his father, the mayor, is missing. The three drive to the object's location. Alice Summers, the mayor's secretary, assists Kettering by recording test results. The senator climbs scaffolding erected around the spiral cone to question Kettering and his assistant, Dr. Wyler. Kettering explains that the cone appears to be indestructible. He then crawls inside to explore. He is inside for a long time so everyone begins to get worried. Just as Wyler prepares to go inside to look for him, Kettering crawls out; the interior is made up of a maze of small, winding tunnels. A field phone call informs them that the mayor has returned to his office.

Mayor Cameron acts as if possessed. He takes a pistol from his desk drawer and struggles to point it at his head. Kettering, the senator, Alice and Glenn arrive at town hall. The mayor is hostile and angry, even towards his son. Kettering notices an odd mound near the mayor's neck, under his suit coat. The mayor pulls the pistol on the group. Kettering asks him about the mound, and the mayor strikes his son while attempting to flee the room. As he does, Kettering hits the mayor, who discharges several gunshots. The mayor is shot and killed in the hallway by a deputy.

An autopsy reveals something strange. The doctor and Kettering find a dead creature of unknown origin attached to the mayor's neck; it injected some kind of toxin into his nervous system. Even without being shot to death, he would have died within 24–48 hours.

As the sheriff drives toward the metal object, he sees a man lying on the road who attacks him as the sheriff gets out of his patrol car. Nearby another man, holding a lighted glass container, watches the fight. The sheriff is knocked out, and the two men remove something from the container. The sheriff revives and the three drive off in the patrol car.

While working with Alice in the lab, Kettering experiments with a piece of the creature taken from the mayor's body. It attaches itself to his arm just like a parasite, but he is able to free himself by burning it with a Bunsen burner. Wyler calls Kettering at the lab, and they drive out to the metal cone. Along the way, they discover an abandoned electric company utility truck. A call to the sheriff from Sen. Powers goes unanswered as the sheriff struggles with being possessed. Three groups are organized to search for other strange metal objects. Kettering and Alice find the dead body of the utility truck's driver with two puncture wounds on the back of his neck. While searching, Glenn and Elaine are locked inside an empty cabin. Someone tries to set the cabin on fire, but Glenn shoots at the arsonist and he and his fiancée are able to escape. The three groups later reassemble at the mayor's office. There, they discover two glowing containers holding more parasites. The senator calls the telegraph office to send a warning to the governor. The telegrapher takes down the message but, being possessed, does not send it.

Three men drive to Alice's apartment building and plant a parasite in her room. She is taken over and joins the men in their car. Paul and Glenn later discover that she is missing. They drive back to the spiral cone and discover a dying man who they recognize as Prof. Helsingman, who vanished five years earlier along with a scientific expedition. They discover marks on his neck and take him to hospital. Kettering questions the professor but he only utters the word "Carboniferous", referring to a geologic time period millions of years ago. Sen. Powers tries to make several telephone calls but is consistently told that the lines are busy. Glenn and Paul go to the telegraph office to find out if the warning was sent to the governor's office. They are attacked but manage to subdue their assailants and flee.

Kettering climbs the metal object's scaffolding to check on his equipment. He realizes that the two deputies on guard are now possessed, and both are shot and killed. Kettering and Glenn crawl inside the cone and discover a room filled with a heavy mist behind a sliding tunnel wall. They are greeted by another member of the missing expedition, an old, bearded man. He tells Kettering that he was once Prof. Cole and explains, "Now I hold a position of a much higher order." He provides details about the parasites' invasion, which is coming from inside the Earth, and says, "We shall force upon Man a life free from strife and turmoil. Ironic that Man should obtain his long-sought utopia as a gift, rather than as something earned". After the possessed Cole disappears, Kettering shoots and kills the lurking sheriff. Parasites on the loose chase Kettering and Glenn outside.

Kettering formulates a plan using the abandoned power company truck. Using a harpoon gun, he connects an electrical wire from one end of the ravine to the other. He prepares to shoot a connecting wire from the metal object to an overhead high voltage transmission line, completing a circuit. Before Kettering can finish, Alice exits the spiral cone and appears on the scaffolding. Kettering climbs up to rescue her but, being possessed, she refuses to go with him. She pulls a pistol and shoots him and he falls to his death. Glenn hesitatingly fires the harpoon gun, making the connection to the overhead transmission lines, which engulfs the grounded metal cone in high-voltage sparks. Alice collapses as the parasites inside the object are electrocuted. After the cone is made safe, Sen. Powers and Glenn crawl inside and verify that the menace has been eliminated. Later, as Glenn and Elaine walk away from the site, they embrace.

Cast

 Ed Nelson as Dr. Paul Kettering 
 Alan Jay Factor as Glenn Cameron 
 Cornelius Keefe as Sen. Walter K. Powers 
 Joanna Lee as Alice Summers
 Jody Fair as Elaine Cameron
 David Hughes as Dr. Wyler
 Robert Ball as Dan Walker
 Greigh Phillips as the Sheriff
 Orville Sherman as Mayor Cameron
 Leonard Nimoy (credited as Leonard Nemoy) as Prof. Cole

Production
The Brain Eaters was known during production as, variously, The Keepers, The Keepers of the Earth, Attack of the Blood Leeches, and Battle of the Brain Eaters.

Actor VeSota wanted to direct a film, so he approached Corman with the script. Corman helped him raise the modest financing needed, as well as arranging distribution through AIP. The film was shot over six days on a budget of $26,000.

After its release, science fiction author Robert A. Heinlein sued for plagiarism, asking for damages of $150,000, claiming that The Brain Eaters was based on his 1951 novel The Puppet Masters. Corman insisted that he was unfamiliar with Heinlein's work, both while reading the script and during the film's production. He did, however, see the obvious comparisons once he'd read the novel, so Corman settled out of court for $5,000 and acceded to Heinlein's demand that he receive no screen credit, as the author found the film "wanting". The lawsuit that resulted halted actor John Payne's intention of producing a film based on Heinlein's novel.

See also
 List of American films of 1958

References

Bibliography
 Warren, Bill. Keep Watching the Skies: American Science Fiction Films of the Fifties, 21st Century Edition. Jefferson, North Carolina: McFarland & Company, 2009 (First Edition 1982). .

External links
 
 
 
 

1958 films
1958 horror films
1950s science fiction horror films
American science fiction horror films
1950s English-language films
Films based on works by Robert A. Heinlein
Films set in Illinois
Alien invasions in films
Films involved in plagiarism controversies
American International Pictures films
1950s American films